Thomas Perronet Thompson (15 March 1783–6 September 1869) was a British Parliamentarian, a governor of Sierra Leone and a radical reformer.  He became prominent in 1830s and 1840s as a leading activist in the Anti-Corn Law League.  He specialized in the grass-roots mobilisation of opinion through pamphlets, newspaper articles, correspondence, speeches, and endless local planning meetings.

Biography

Thompson was born in Kingston upon Hull in March 1783. He was son of Thomas Thompson, a banker of Hull and his wife, Philothea Perronet Briggs. The name Perronet was from his mother's grandfather, Vincent Perronet, vicar of Shoreham and a friend of John Wesley and his brother Charles Wesley. He was educated at Hull Grammar School. He graduated from Queens' College, Cambridge in 1802 with the rank of seventh Wrangler. From 1803, Thompson served as a midshipman in the Royal Navy, switching to the British Army (as a lieutenant) in 1806. Thompson became Governor of Sierra Leone between August 1808 and June 1810, due in part to his acquaintance with William Wilberforce. He was recalled from the job after complaining about the system by which "freed" slaves were compulsorily "apprenticed" for fourteen years. He wrote that Wilberforce and the Sierra Leone Company had "by means of their agents become slave traders themselves". He threatened to expose this situation, so he was sacked, with Wilberforce himself agreeing to the dismissal.

In 1812, Thompson returned to his military duties, and, after serving in the south of France, was in 1815 attached as Arabic interpreter to an expedition against the Wahabees of the Persian Gulf, with whom he negotiated a treaty (dated January 1820) in which the slave trade was for the first time declared piracy. Whilst in the Army, Thompson was promoted to major in 1825, lieutenant colonel in 1829 and in later years was made a major general. While serving in the Army in India, his second son, Charles, was born at Bombay.

As a radical reformer, Thompson wrote the True Theory of Rent and A Catechism on the Corn Laws. He also joint-owned the Westminster Review for a time. He wrote several articles in the journal supporting universal suffrage, and his articles were republished in 1842 in six volumes.

Thompson represented Kingston upon Hull in the House of Commons from 1835 to 1837 and was elected to represent Bradford between 1847 and 1852, and again from 1857 to 1859.

Thompson died in September 1869 aged 86. Monuments to his second son General Charles William Thompson, his youngest son Lieutenant Colonel John Wycliffe Thompson, who served in the Crimean War, and his youngest daughter Anne Elise are in the chancel of St Mary's Church, Cottingham, near Hull.

Personal life

Thompson was interested in music, writing books on harmony and just intonation e.g. for the guitar (Instructions to my daughter for playing on the enharmonic guitar). His mathematical publications were somewhat eccentric. He published a Theory of Parallels in 1844, and was also the author of Geometry without Axioms, in which he endeavoured to "get rid of" axioms.

Thompson was teetotal and a vegetarian.

Notes

References

Further reading 
General T. Perronet Thompson by Leonard George Johnson
"Raising up Dark Englishmen": Thomas Perronet Thompson, Colonies, Race, and the Indian Mutiny by Michael J. Turner (Journal of Colonialism and Colonial History - Volume 6, Number 1, Spring 2005)

External links

 Information on Thomas Perronet Thompson, pub. 1840 (Saunders' portraits and memoirs of eminent living political reformers ...; by John Saunders; 1840)
Information (Hull City Council)
 Thomas Perronet Thompson
 Thomas Perronet Thompson letters, John Rylands Library, University of Manchester.
Images
 Image from a painting by B. E. Duppa
 Image of Thomas Perronet Thompson (Royal Academy of Music)
Writings
Google books
Archive.org
Papers of Thomas Perronet Thompson (1783 - 1869)  (Hull University Archives)
Correspondence and family papers of Thomas Perronet Thompson (University of Leeds)
Papers of Thomas Perronet Thompson relating to Sierra Leone (British Online Archives)

1783 births
1869 deaths
Politicians from Kingston upon Hull
Alumni of Queens' College, Cambridge
People educated at Hull Grammar School
Members of the Parliament of the United Kingdom for English constituencies
UK MPs 1835–1837
UK MPs 1847–1852
Governors of Sierra Leone
Royal Navy officers
British Army generals
Fellows of the Royal Society
Rifle Brigade officers
14th King's Hussars officers
17th Lancers officers
British Army personnel of the Napoleonic Wars
65th Regiment of Foot officers
People from Cottingham, East Riding of Yorkshire
Fellows of Queens' College, Cambridge